1. FC Köln Frauen is 1. FC Köln's women's football section, currently competing in the Bundesliga.

History
The club existed since July 2009, FFC Brauweiler Pulheim dissolved their club to join 1. FC Köln. In their first season in 2009–10, they managed to come in third in the 2. Bundesliga. They achieved promotion to the Bundesliga in 2015. The team is coached by Willi Breuer.

Current squad

Past seasons

References

External links

Women's football clubs in Germany
Football clubs in North Rhine-Westphalia
Association football clubs established in 2009
Women
2009 establishments in Germany
Frauen-Bundesliga clubs